The term special circumstances can have various meanings:

A defense to legal charges
Special circumstances (criminal law), actions or involvement of an accused deserving a more severe punishment
"Special Circumstances", episode of The Law (TV series)

"Special Circumstances” a fictional intelligence and espionage agency in the Culture novels by Iain M. Banks